In algebraic geometry, a linear system of divisors is an algebraic generalization of the geometric notion of a family of curves; the dimension of the linear system corresponds to the number of parameters of the family.

These arose first in the form of a linear system of algebraic curves in the projective plane. It assumed a more general form, through gradual generalisation, so that one could speak of linear equivalence of divisors D on a general scheme or even a ringed space (X, OX).

Linear system of dimension 1, 2, or 3 are called a pencil, a net, or a web, respectively.

A map determined by a linear system is sometimes called the Kodaira map.

Definitions 
Given a general variety , two divisors  are linearly equivalent if

Here  denotes the divisor of zeroes and poles of the function .

Note that if  has singular points, the notion of 'divisor' is inherently ambiguous (Cartier divisors, Weil divisors: see divisor (algebraic geometry)). The definition in that case is usually said with greater care (using invertible sheaves or holomorphic line bundles); see below.

It is denoted . A complete linear system  is therefore a projective space.

A linear system  is then a projective subspace of a complete linear system, so it corresponds to a vector subspace W of  The dimension of the linear system  is its dimension as a projective space. Hence .

Linear systems can also be introduced by means of the line bundle or invertible sheaf language. In those terms, divisors  (Cartier divisors, to be precise) correspond to line bundles, and linear equivalence of two divisors means that the corresponding line bundles are isomorphic.

Examples

Linear equivalence 
Consider the line bundle  on  whose sections  define quadric surfaces. For the associated divisor , it is linearly equivalent to any other divisor defined by the vanishing locus of some  using the rational function  (Proposition 7.2). Then, there is the equivalence of divisors

Linear systems on curves 
One of the important complete linear systems on an algebraic curve  of genus  is given by the complete linear system associated with the canonical divisor , denoted .

Hyperelliptic curves 
One application of linear systems is used in the classification of algebraic curves. A hyperelliptic curve is a curve  with a degree  morphism .

grd 
A  is a linear system  on a curve  which is of degree  and dimension . For example, hyperelliptic curves have a  since  defines one. In fact, hyperelliptic curves have a unique  from proposition 5.3.

Linear systems of hypersurfaces in a projective space
If we take global sections , then we can take its projectivization . This is isomorphic to  where

Then, using any embedding  we can construct a linear system of dimension .

Linear system of conics

Characteristic linear system of a family of curves
The characteristic linear system of a family of curves on an algebraic surface Y for a curve C in the family is a linear system formed by the curves in the family  that are infinitely near C.

Note a characteristic system need not to be complete; in fact, the question of completeness is something studied extensively by the Italian school without a satisfactory conclusion; nowadays, the Kodaira–Spencer theory can be used to answer the question of the completeness.

Other examples 
The Cayley–Bacharach theorem is a property of a pencil of cubics, which states that the base locus satisfies an "8 implies 9" property: any cubic containing 8 of the points necessarily contains the 9th.

Linear systems in birational geometry

In general linear systems became a basic tool of birational geometry as practised by the Italian school of algebraic geometry. The technical demands became quite stringent; later developments clarified a number of issues. The computation of the relevant dimensions — the Riemann–Roch problem as it can be called — can be better phrased in terms of homological algebra. The effect of working on varieties with singular points is to show up a difference between Weil divisors (in the free abelian group generated by codimension-one subvarieties), and Cartier divisors coming from sections of invertible sheaves.

The Italian school liked to reduce the geometry on an algebraic surface to that of linear systems cut out by surfaces in three-space; Zariski wrote his celebrated book Algebraic Surfaces to try to pull together the methods, involving linear systems with fixed base points. There was a controversy, one of the final issues in the conflict between 'old' and 'new' points of view in algebraic geometry, over Henri Poincaré's characteristic linear system of an algebraic family of curves on an algebraic surface.

Base locus 
The base locus of a linear system of divisors on a variety refers to the subvariety of points 'common' to all divisors in the linear system. Geometrically, this corresponds to the common intersection of the varieties. Linear systems may or may not have a base locus – for example, the pencil of affine lines  has no common intersection, but given two (nondegenerate) conics in the complex projective plane, they intersect in four points (counting with multiplicity) and thus the pencil they define has these points as base locus.

More precisely, suppose that  is a complete linear system of divisors on some variety . Consider the intersection

 

where  denotes the support of a divisor, and the intersection is taken over all effective divisors  in the linear system.

One application of the notion of base locus is to nefness of a Cartier divisor class (i.e. complete linear system). Basic facts from intersection theory then tell us that we must have . The conclusion is that to check nefness of a divisor class, it suffices to compute the intersection number with curves contained in the base locus of the class. So, roughly speaking, the 'smaller' the base locus, the 'more likely' it is that the class is nef.

A simple consequence is that the bundle is globally generated if and only if the base locus is empty.

The notion of the base locus still makes sense for a non-complete linear system as well: the base locus of it is still the intersection of the supports of all the effective divisors in the system.

Example 

A map determined by a linear system 

Each linear system on an algebraic variety determines a morphism from the complement of the base locus to a projective space of dimension of the system, as follows. (In a sense, the converse is also true; see the section below)

Let L be a line bundle on an algebraic variety X and  a finite-dimensional vector subspace. For the sake of clarity, we first consider the case when V is base-point-free; in other words, the natural map  is surjective (here, k = the base field). Or equivalently,  is surjective. Hence, writing  for the trivial vector bundle and passing the surjection to the relative Proj, there is a closed immersion:

where  on the right is the invariance of the projective bundle under a twist by a line bundle. Following i by a projection, there results in the map:

Finally, when a basis of V is chosen, the above discussion becomes more down-to-earth (and that is the style used in Hartshorne, Algebraic Geometry).

Linear system determined by a map to a projective space 

Each morphism from an algebraic variety to a projective space determines a base-point-free linear system on the variety; because of this, a base-point-free linear system and a map to a projective space are often used interchangeably.

O(1) on a projective variety 
This sends a point  to its corresponding point .

See also 

 Brill–Noether theory
Lefschetz pencil
bundle of principal parts

References

 
 Hartshorne, R. Algebraic Geometry, Springer-Verlag, 1977; corrected 6th printing, 1993. .
 Lazarsfeld, R., Positivity in Algebraic Geometry I, Springer-Verlag, 2004. .

Geometry of divisors